Championia is a genus of flowering plants belonging to the family Gesneriaceae.

Its native range is Sri Lanka.

Species:
 Championia reticulata Gardner

References

Didymocarpoideae
Gesneriaceae genera